Ahmed Moustafa Hussein (born May 25, 1983) is an Egyptian former swimmer who specialized in backstroke events. He is a two-time Olympian, and a three-time All-American swimmer for the Arizona State Sun Devils at Arizona State University in Tempe, Arizona, where he majored in and graduated with a bachelor's degree in civil engineering.

Hussein made his first Egyptian team at the 2000 Summer Olympics in Sydney, where he competed in the men's 200 m backstroke. Swimming in heat two, he edged out Singapore's Gary Tan to earn a fifth spot and thirty-sixth overall by 0.22 of a second in 2:06.10.

At the 2004 Summer Olympics in Athens, Hussein extended his program by qualifying for two swimming events. He claimed two gold medals from the All-Africa Games in Abuja, Nigeria, breaking an Egyptian record and meeting a FINA B-cut of 55.75 (100 m backstroke) and 2:02.45 (200 m backstroke).

In the 100 m backstroke, Hussein participated in heat three against seven other swimmers, including Olympic veteran Derya Büyükuncu of Turkey. He raced to sixth place and thirty-first overall by 0.52 of a second behind Buyukuncu, outside his personal best of 56.86. In his second event, 200 m backstroke, Hussein matched his position from the 100-metre backstroke on the morning's preliminaries. Hussein saved a seventh spot on the same heat as Sydney over South Korea's Sung Min, who finished behind him in last place by 0.04 of a second, with a time of 2:04.82.

At the 2005 Mediterranean Games in Almería, Spain, Hussein won a total of three medals in the same discipline, a silver in the 100 (56.06) and a bronze in the 50 m backstroke (25.86). In the 200 m backstroke, he lowered his own Egyptian record of 2:01.61 to claim another bronze.

References

External links

 

1983 births
Living people
Egyptian male swimmers
Olympic swimmers of Egypt
Swimmers at the 2000 Summer Olympics
Swimmers at the 2004 Summer Olympics
Male backstroke swimmers
American people of Egyptian descent
Sportspeople from Fullerton, California
Sportspeople from Cairo
Arizona State Sun Devils men's swimmers
Mediterranean Games silver medalists for Egypt
Mediterranean Games bronze medalists for Egypt
Swimmers at the 2005 Mediterranean Games
African Games gold medalists for Egypt
African Games medalists in swimming
Mediterranean Games medalists in swimming
Competitors at the 2003 All-Africa Games